Gloeocercospora sorghi is a plant pathogen and causal agent of zonate leaf spot also known as copper spot on Sorghum bicolor (though it can infect several other hosts). It is used as a bioherbicide.

References

External links 
 Index Fungorum
 USDA ARS Fungal Database

Fungal plant pathogens and diseases
Ascomycota enigmatic taxa